The women's shot put event  at the 1976 European Athletics Indoor Championships was held on 22 February in Munich.

Results

References

Shot put at the European Athletics Indoor Championships
Shot
Euro